The 1974 Virginia Cavaliers football team represented the University of Virginia during the 1974 NCAA Division I football season. The Cavaliers were led by first-year head coach Sonny Randle and played their home games at Scott Stadium in Charlottesville, Virginia. They competed as members of the Atlantic Coast Conference, finishing in sixth.

Schedule

Personnel

References

Virginia
Virginia Cavaliers football seasons
Virginia Cavaliers football